Laryea Adjetey (born 24 October 1973) is a Ghanaian retired footballer who played in the USL A-League, and the Canadian Professional Soccer League.

Club career
Adjetey began his professional career with the Toronto Lynx of the USL A-League in 2000. He helped Toronto finish third in the Northeast Division, and secured a postseason berth for the organization. He appeared in all playoff matches, and including the Eastern finals match against Rochester Rhinos, where the Lynx were eliminated by a score of 2–1 on goals on aggregate. The following season, he signed with expansion franchise the Brampton Hitmen of the Canadian Professional Soccer League. He played with Brampton for two seasons, but failed to reach the postseason with the franchise.

References

Living people
1973 births
Ghanaian footballers
Association football midfielders
Toronto Lynx players
Brampton Stallions (Hitmen) players
A-League (1995–2004) players
Canadian Soccer League (1998–present) players
Ghanaian expatriate footballers
Expatriate soccer players in Canada
Ghanaian expatriate sportspeople in Canada